The Royal Advisory Council for Saharan Affairs is an advisory committee to the Moroccan government on Western Sahara. It was created under Mohammed VI in early 2006, after a new autonomy plan proposed by Morocco to replace the United Nations' Baker Plan. The Polisario Front opposes Morocco's autonomy plan, demanding for a referendum and independence.

Mission
The CORCAS is a consultative body for proposals related to what Morocco calls their Southern Provinces, CORCAS also defends Morocco's claim over Western Sahara in local media and abroad. The CORCAS fully condemns the refugee camps of Tindouf and the Polisario Front, citing human rights concerns.

Composition
There are 141 members of CORCAS, mostly Moroccan Sahrawi politicians and tribal leaders. The members were appointed by the King of Morocco and support Morocco's claim on Western Sahara. Khalili Erguibi, the father of the late Polisario Front leader and SADR president, Mohamed Abdelaziz was a member of CORCAS until his death in 2017.

The president of CORCAS, Khalihenna Ould-Errachid, founded the Partido de Unión Nacional Saharaui (PUNS) in 1974, the party supported the Spanish colonization of Spanish Sahara. After the departure of the Spanish in 1975 and the disbanding of the PUNS, Ould-Errachid pledged allegiance to the king of Morocco at the time, Hassan II and helped organize the Green March, he is an active defender of Morocco's claim over Western Sahara.

International activities
Members of CORCAS are regularly featured in the Moroccan press. The president of CORCAS, Khalihenna Ould-Errachid, regularly attends meetings in international forums, such as the United Nations, where Western Sahara is discussed. Most notably, Ould-Errachid has met with the President of the People's Republic of China, Hu Jintao.

Criticism
In 2008, a transcript from a 2005 Equity and Reconciliation Commission meeting regarding the Western Sahara War was leaked to Al-Jarida al-Oula, during the meeting, Ould-Errachid declared that "there are some people [...], about three or four Army officers who have committed what can be called war crimes against prisoners outside the scope of the war" and that "many civilians were thrown from helicopters or buried alive".

In an interview with the independent Moroccan weekly magazine Le Journal Hebdomadaire, the ex-chairman of CORCAS' Human Rights Commission and head of the Association of Sahrawi Victims of Repression in the Tindouf Camps, El Houcine Baïda, criticized the lack of tackling human rights issues, and about the manner which Ould-Errachid runs the Council. In his opinion, the country's actions in the Western Sahara were alienating Sahrawis, and thus could push more youth towards what he defined as separatism. He further claimed that most of the organization's members had no knowledge of the government's autonomy plan - that they were supposedly responsible for drafting - and that president Ould-Errachid runs the council's affairs despotically, like "a new Franco".

See also
History of Morocco
History of Western Sahara
Sahrawi Arab Democratic Republic (SADR)
Sahrawi National Council (SNC)

Notes

External links
Royal Advisory Council for Saharan Affairs (CORCAS) – Official site in 
Le CORCAS 
Video of CORCAS President Khalihenna Ould Errachid, introducing the mission of the council

Politics of Morocco
Politics of Western Sahara
Political organizations based in Western Sahara